Louis-Hébert is a federal electoral district in the Canadian province of Quebec. Represented in the House of Commons since 1968, its population was certified, according to the detailed statistics of 2001, as 98,156.

Geography
The district, in the Quebec region of Capitale-Nationale, consists of the southern part of Quebec City, and is largely coextensive with the borough of Sainte-Foy–Sillery–Cap-Rouge. It is based mostly on the former city of Sainte-Foy, which was merged into the "megacity" of Quebec City in 2002.

The neighbouring ridings are Portneuf—Jacques-Cartier, Louis-Saint-Laurent, Québec, Lévis—Bellechasse, and Lotbinière—Chutes-de-la-Chaudière.

The riding lost small fractions of territory to Louis-Saint-Laurent and Québec as a result of the 2012 electoral redistribution.

Demographics
According to the Canada 2011 Census

Ethnic groups: 91.3% White, 2.2% Indigenous, 1.8% Arab, 1.6% Latino, 1.4% Black, 0.6% Chinese, 1.1% Other
Languages: 91.2% French, 2.2% English, 1.6% Spanish, 1.4% Arabic, 3.6% Other
Religions: 82.6% Christian, 2.5% Muslim, 0.6% Other, 14.3% None
Median income: $34,624 (2010) 
Average income: $45,439 (2010)

History
The electoral district was created in 1966 from Quebec East, Quebec South, Quebec West, and Québec—Montmorency ridings. The riding is notable for having had nine different people represent the riding since 1984; Suzanne Duplessis was elected that year and served two terms in the House of Commons until 1993. From then until 2019, every subsequent MP to represent the district was either defeated in the next election or retired from politics after a single term.

Members of parliament

This riding has elected the following members of parliament:

Election results

	

Note: Conservative vote is compared to the total of the Canadian Alliance vote and Progressive Conservative vote in the 2000 election.

	

Note: Canadian Alliance vote is compared to the Reform vote in 1997 election.

	

Note: Social Credit vote is compared to Ralliement créditiste vote in the 1968 election.

See also
 List of Canadian federal electoral districts
 Past Canadian electoral districts

References

Campaign expense data from Elections Canada
Riding history from the Library of Parliament

Notes

Quebec federal electoral districts
Federal electoral districts of Quebec City